Xiao Hong or Hsiao Hung (1 June 1911 – 22 January 1942) was a Chinese writer. Her ruming (乳名，infant name) was Zhang Ronghua (張榮華). Her xueming (學名，formal name used at school) was Zhang Xiuhuan (張秀環). Her name Zhang Naiying was changed by her grandfather; she also used the pen names Qiao Yin and Lingling.

Xiao Hong's childhood
Xiao Hong was born into a wealthy landlord family on 1 June 1911 the day of the Dragon Boat Festival in Hulan County, in what is now Heilongjiang Province. Xiao Hong's childhood was not a happy one. Her mother died when she was nine years old and she attended a girls school in Harbin in 1927, where she encountered the progressive ideas of the May Fourth movement as well as Chinese and foreign literature. Her childhood was deeply influenced by two people: her father, he was apparently a difficult man who was cold and ruthless, and her grandfather, who was the only one in the family who understood her. In her "Yong yuan de chong jing he zhui qiu" (Published on 1979) she writes, "Father often lost his humanity for the sake of greed. He treated his servants, his children, and my grandfather with the same miserliness and alienation, even ruthlessness." After her father beat Xiao Hong, she would hide in her grandfather's room. Grandfather would pat her down and say, "Grow up! It's good to grow up." Xiao Hong got warmth and love from where her grandfather was.

The Love of Xiao Hong
Through Xiao Hong's biography whose childhood set the pattern for her future relationships with her friends and lovers. She believes she is either cherished and protected, or abandoned and tortured This situation had a strong impact with her father.

In 1929 her father told her that she needed to accept an arranged marriage to force her to marry Wang Enjia.

Fearing the marriage and with nothing to keep her in Hulan after the death of her grandfather, Xiao Hong fled her home. In "Early Winter" (Chu dong) she wrote: "I cannot go back to that kind of home. I'm not willing to be supported by a father who stands at the opposite pole from me."

In 1932 Wang Enjia abandoned her and left her in a hotel while Xiao Hong was still pregnant. Unable to support the child, Xiao Hong put the child up for adoption.

On the brink of collapse due to Wang Enjia's abandonment and desperate, Xiao Hong chose to write to the local newspaper for help. The newspaper editor was so shocked by Xiao Hong's experience that he sent Xiao Jun (real name: Liu Honglin) to confirm the event's authenticity. This was the first time that Xiao Hong met Xiao Jun（1.Xiao Jun）.After seeing Xiao Hong, Xiao Jun was attracted by Xiao Hong's talent and he decided to save Xiao Hong. This gave Xiao Hong a new hope.

In August 1932 Xiao Hong and Xiao Jun decided to live together.

In 1938 Xiao Hong meets Duanmu Hongliang and falls in love with him, ending her 6 years of relationship with Xiao Jun

Xiao Hong and Duanmu Hongliang got married in May 1938 in Wuhan.

Xiao Hong's literary composition
Qier (棄兒, Abandoned Child) (1933). Xiao Hong's first published story. Used Qiao Yin as the pen name.
Bashe (跋涉, Trudging) (1933). Xiao Hong and Xiao Jun privately published a joint collection of stories and essays
The Field of Life and Death (Shengsi chang, 生死場) (1934) was Xiao Hong's debut novel, written in Qingdao. Lu Xun described its "keen observations and extraordinary writing style." This was the first time that Xiao Hong used the pen name by which she is presently known and this work marked the beginning of her popularity.
Yong jiu de chong jing yu zhui qiu （永久的憧憬與追求） (1936). Xiao Hong's sketch.
Shang Shijie (商市街, Market Street, also entitled A Chinese Woman in Harbin) (1936). A series of sketches of daily occurrences based on her first two years with Xiao Jun in Harbin.
Huiyi Lu Xun Xiansheng (回憶魯迅先生, Memories of Mr. Lu Xun), (1940).
Ma Bole, (1940). A satirical novel set in Qingdao and Shanghai.
Hulanhe zhuan (呼蘭河傳, Tales of Hulan River), (1942). Hulan he zhuan has presented a dilemma for literary historians of modern China, cause of it has an unprecedented attempt to weave personal history together with history of a region.
Hand (手). An important text in the literature of the suffering working body.

Xiao Hong and Lu Xun
In 1927 Xiao Hong became a reader of the New Literature, Lu Xun's works have become Xiao Hong's favorite works. Xiao Hong's writing focuses on relational aspects of self — her connection to the community and others, as well as their shared emotions and experiences.

Before Xiao Hong and Xiao Jun went to Shanghai, they sent a manuscript of their work to Lu Xun. Before they arrived in Shanghai, Lu Xun read the manuscript. He accepted their request to join the young leftist authors. Lu Xun published both Xiao Hong and Xiao Jun's novels in his Slave Series (Nuli congshu).

Xiao Hong's death
She died during the chaos of wartime Hong Kong in the temporary hospital of St. Stephen's Girls' College on January 22, 1942. She was buried at dusk on January 25, 1942 in Hong Kong's Repulse Bay. Her grave was moved to Guangzhou in August 1957.

Selected works in English translation
The Field of Life and Death & Tales of Hulan River, Indiana University Press, 1979. 
Anthology of Modern Chinese Stories and Novels, with Xiao Hong's short stories "Hands" and "Family Outsider", 1980

Vague Expectations: Xiao Hong Miscellany , Hong Kong: Research Centre for Translation, 2020.

In popular culture
A biopic of Xiao Hong's life directed by Huo Jianqi, titled Falling Flowers, was released in 2012 in China. This was followed in 2014 by a further biopic, The Golden Era, directed by Hong Kong director Ann Hui.

References

External links

Xiao Hong. A Portrait by Kong Kai Ming at Portrait Gallery of Chinese Writers (Hong Kong Baptist University Library)

1911 births
1942 deaths
Republic of China novelists
Writers from Harbin
Short story writers from Heilongjiang
Republic of China poets
Republic of China essayists
Chinese women essayists
Chinese women poets
20th-century Chinese women writers
20th-century Chinese novelists
20th-century Chinese poets
Poets from Heilongjiang
Chinese women novelists
20th-century essayists
Chinese women short story writers
20th-century Chinese short story writers
Republic of China short story writers